The Ghatnandur train crash occurred on 3 January 2003, when a passenger train travelling from Secunderabad to Manmad crashed into the rear end of a heavy goods train near Ambajogai tehsil Ghatnandur in Maharashtra, India.

The accident happened in the early morning of the 3rd, when the passenger train, which was supposed to bypass the station on a loop line, was not transferred onto this line by the station officers at Ghatnandur, and so collided with the stationary freight train berthed on the main line of the station. Three carriages were derailed, thanks to the driver, who was killed, slowing the train down at the last minute. Rescue operations, initially carried out by local people, then by military and emergency services, were able to rescue most of the trapped and injured people quickly, helped by the wreckage not catching fire, as often happens in the circumstances.

18 passengers were killed instantly, and 41 badly injured, including several children who were airlifted to hospital in Hyderabad, over 300 km away, by the Indian Air Force. The rail authorities offered compensation to the victims and families of victims, as is customary, with the amounts decided with a sliding scale based on the severity of the injury.

The station officials, realising what their mistake had caused, fled in panic, and remained in hiding for many days. Eventually, all were caught and suspended without pay for the duration of an investigation, which found that they had failed to change the track of the approaching train, and to warn the driver of the hazards ahead in sufficient time. They were  Prashant Kumar Verma, Vinayak Neelakantha, Shesharao Sayedu, Srinivas Suryavanshi and G Krishnaih. Indian Railways minister, Nitish Kumar was quoted in the aftermath as saying: 

"It was a human failure as the point was not set for the train which went ahead on the same track where another train was already stationed".

External links
 CNN News Report
 Daily Times News Report
 News Report

2003 disasters in India
Railway accidents and incidents in Maharashtra
Railway accidents in 2003
History of Maharashtra (1947–present)
Train collisions in India